Hendrik Egnatius 'Naas' Botha (born 27 February 1958) is a South African former rugby union player, who played for Northern Transvaal and South Africa (the Springboks).

He was voted Rugby Player of the Year in 1979, 1981, 1985 and 1987. Botha mostly played in the fly-half position and is now a rugby commentator for the South African M-Net and Supersport TV channels. He is also the Head coach of the Men's and women's national rugby union team of India.

Family and early career 

Botha was born in the town of Breyten in the Eastern Transvaal (now Mpumalanga), South Africa and went to school at the Hoërskool Hendrik Verwoerd in Pretoria. As a child, Botha aspired to playing professional baseball and applied for a sport scholarship in the United States. Botha was also an excellent schools cricket and tennis player and also a hurdles athlete.

However, Botha was selected to play for the South African under-20 rugby team, where he caught the eye of the selectors while still a student at the University of Pretoria.

As a result, Botha played his first Test for the Springboks on 26 April 1980 at the age of 22 in the flyhalf position against South America at Wanderers, Johannesburg.

Rugby union 

Botha was best known for extremely accurate (both left- and right-footed) kicking, which earned him the nickname "Nasty Booter" from the British press when the British Lions toured South Africa in 1980. He is best remembered for his abilities as a very successful drop-kicker in high pressure situations and is also considered to have had an outstanding tactical understanding of rugby.

While Botha was sometimes criticised for avoiding physical contact and not running with the ball, his handling of the ball was very deft and he could get his backline moving very quickly with accurate short and long range passing. As a result, he scored many tries and contributed to many more. However, some consider that he was somewhat weak in defence. Nevertheless, Danie Craven once said, "Give me Naas, and I'll conquer the world!"

Botha remained the highest points scorer in Springbok rugby history for a number of years, with a points total of 312. His tally was passed by Percy Montgomery on 17 July 2004. However, Montgomery passed him in his 50th match, while Botha had only played in 28.

In addition to his Springbok rugby-playing duties, Botha also played for the Northern Transvaal province (nicknamed the "Blou Bulle", which means "Blue Bulls", now their official name) from 1977 to 1995. During this period his contributions ensured that they dominated domestic South African rugby, and won the Currie Cup nine times (sharing it twice with Western Province in 1979 and 1989). He was also captain of the province a record 128 times, and scored a record 2,511 points (including 1,699 points in the Currie Cup).

The 1981 tour and sporting bans 

In 1981, Botha travelled with the Springboks to South America; they subsequently beat Ireland and France in their warm-up to their tour of New Zealand. Public opinion was deeply divided over the New Zealand tour, but Botha and his fellow Springboks focused on playing rugby, which was made difficult by actions such as pitch invasions and aircraft fly-bys from protesters opposed to South Africa's apartheid policies. South Africa lost the series 2–1, but the implications of the tour went far beyond rugby.

As an indirect result of this tour, South Africa was banned by the International Rugby Board from international competition until 1992, which meant apart from hosting the rebel New Zealand Cavaliers tour in 1986, Botha played few international games. Domestically he made up for it, however: in 15 seasons playing for Northern Transvaal he played in 11 Currie Cup finals, winning nine (two shared) and scoring a record 2,511 points.

International career 

In the pre-professional era that Botha played in, being paid to play rugby was always a controversial subject. Despite being handsomely paid "under the table", Botha was of the opinion that he could earn more in professional sport and thus he travelled to the United States in 1983 on the invitation of the American football team the Dallas Cowboys to try out as a placekicker. This move was not successful, however, and he returned to South Africa to continue his rugby career. While in the United States, Naas played rugby with the Dallas Harlequins, where he led them to the 1984 USA National Club Championships.

In 1987, once again primarily for monetary considerations, Botha moved to the Italian club Rugby Rovigo, where he was coached by the former Springboks coach Nelie Smith and played alongside fellow South Africans Tito Lupini and Gert Smal. During the course of 6 seasons, Botha played 119 games for Rovigo and helped the team winning two National Championships (in 1988 and 1990), ending a 9 years drought, also reaching the final twice (1989 and 1992), in addition to a semifinal (1991) and a quarter final (1993). The Botha-era is still vividly remembered in Rovigo, the most rugby-addicted city in Italy, where the former player enjoys a sort of Maradona/Napoli aura.

Return to the Springboks 

Botha's career lasted long enough for him to see South Africa let back into the international rugby fold and to play in one-off Tests against World Cup holders Australia and New Zealand. Both games ended in defeat and Botha then toured France with the Springboks before bowing out in a 33–16 defeat on 14 November 1992 at the age of 34 as flyhalf against England at Twickenham, London. He had set countless Springbok records during his rugby career and is still considered to be one of the Springbok "greats".

Personal life 

Botha is married to Karen, a former Springbok athlete and long jump record-holder; the couple have three daughters, Kyla (1991) Gaeby (1998) and Lee-gre (2003).

Career stats

Summary

Test match record

Legend: pen = penalty (3 pts.); con = conversion (2 pts.), drop = drop kick (3 pts.).

See also

List of South Africa national rugby union players – Springbok no. 502

References

External links
 Naas Botha's homepage

1958 births
Living people
People from Msukaligwa Local Municipality
Afrikaner people
South African rugby union players
South Africa international rugby union players
Rugby union fly-halves
World Rugby Hall of Fame inductees
University of Pretoria alumni
South Africa national rugby union team captains
Rugby union players from Mpumalanga
Blue Bulls players